Cläre Lotto (23 September 1893 – 23 August 1952) was a German film actress of the silent era. She appeared in 41 films between 1916 and 1933. She married German film actor Carl de Vogt, with whom she had a son with, Karl Franz de Vogt (born 14 May 1917).

Selected filmography

 Az Ezredes (1917)
 Lili (1918)
 A 99-es számú bérkocsi (1918)
 A Napraforgós hölgy (1918)
 Auf den Trümmern des Paradieses (1920)
 Die Todeskarawane (1920)
 The Lord of the Beasts (1921)
 In Thrall to the Claw (1921)
 The Thirteen of Steel (1921)
 The White Desert (1922)
 Alone in the Jungle (1922)
 The Homecoming of Odysseus (1922)
 Demon Circus (1923)
 The Terror of the Sea (1924)
 Slaves of Love (1924)
 Prater (1924)
 Ballettratten (1925)
 The Girl from America (1925)
 Flight Around the World (1925)
 Curfew (1925)
 Hell of Love (1926)
 Distorting at the Resort (1932)

References

External links

1893 births
1952 deaths
People from Uckermark (district)
People from the Province of Pomerania
German stage actresses
German film actresses
German silent film actresses
20th-century German actresses